Lycopolis or Lykopolis (Greek: , Strabo xvii. p. 802; Steph.

The city was besieged by Ptolemy V during civil strife:
He went to the stronghold of Shekan [which was] fortified by the enemy with every device... he laid siege to the stronghold in question with a wall around its exterior on account of the enemies who were within it who had inflicted great wrong upon Egypt, having abandoned the path of duty to Pharaoh and duty [to the] gods.
The king "seized the stronghold in question by force in a short time" having cut off the water supply to the fortress and taken control of the irrigation canals.

See also
 List of ancient Egyptian towns and cities

References

Cities in ancient Egypt
Former populated places in Egypt